Witold Gerutto (1 October 1912 in Harbin, China – 13 October 1973 in Konstancin) was a Polish shot putter and decathlete who competed in the 1948 Summer Olympics.

References

1912 births
1973 deaths
Polish male shot putters
Olympic athletes of Poland
Athletes (track and field) at the 1948 Summer Olympics
Athletes from Harbin
Polish decathletes